Walter W. Powers  (September 2, 1922 – May 25, 1985) a former Councilman and Mayor of North Sacramento, served in the California legislature as an Assemblyman from November 27, 1962 - November 30, 1974, losing the Democratic primary in 1974 and, attempting a comeback in 1982, losing the Republican primary in that year. During World War II he served in the United States Marine Corps. He received the Distinguished Flying Cross Award for extraordinary achievement while participating in aerial flight, in actions against enemy Japanese forces in the Pacific Theater of Operations during World War II.

References

United States Marine Corps personnel of World War II
1922 births
1985 deaths
Recipients of the Distinguished Flying Cross (United States)
Democratic Party members of the California State Assembly
20th-century American politicians